Coptic music is the music sung and played in the Coptic Orthodox Church (Church of Egypt) and the Coptic Catholic Church. It consists mainly of chanted hymns in rhythm with instruments such as cymbals (hand and large size) and the triangle. Coptic music is purely religious.

Coptic chant is a very old tradition, assumed to have links with the ancient liturgies of Jerusalem or Syria, however, manuscripts survive only since recent times and little is known for sure about the older tradition. Until these recent liturgical books, the music was transmitted orally. In the modern chant, there is extensive use of melody types, which allow some improvisation by the singers.

The percussion instruments used in the Coptic Church are unusual among Christian liturgies. Since similar instruments appear in ancient Egyptian frescoes and reliefs, some believe that they may represent a survival from a very old tradition.

The most famous modern Coptic cantor is the late Cantor Mikhail Girgis El Batanouny, whose recordings have helped preserve and unify many ancient chants that otherwise would have been lost, however, they were recorded in Greco-Bohairic Pronunciation.

Contemporary personalities contributing to Coptic music 
Mikhail Girgis El Batanouny
Adel Kamel
Ragheb Moftah
Ernest Newlandsmith
Nabila Erian
Emmanuel Saad
Abanob Ghobrial

See also
Music of Egypt
Coptic Orthodox Church
Institute of Coptic Studies
Agpeya

References

External links
"The Transmission of Coptic Orthodox Liturgical Music: Historical and Contemporary Forms of Theorization, Translation, and Identity Construction" A PhD dissertation exploring the history and current practice and theory of Coptic music.
 "Coptic youth blog" Contains digital music and videos of Coptic liturgies, hymns, songs, and Coptic hymn lessons.
"Coptic Music," Claremont Coptic Encyclopedia
 Complete collection of Cantor Mikhail Girgis El Batanouny's recordings of Coptic chant from coptichymns.net
 DeaconTube - A video learning website for Coptic Orthodox hymns
 coptichymns.net coptichymns.net - Sharing the Joy of Coptic Hymns Around the World copticheritage.org The Official Website of the Heritage of the Coptic Orthodox Church.''
 Coptic Music, Hymns, and Rites Articles from coptichymns.net
 Coptic Music Articles
 Coptic Multimedia Archive at Saint TeklaHimanot Church of Egypt Articles
Coptic Orthodox Liturgical Chant & Hymnody and the Ragheb Moftah Collection at the Library of Congress

 
Egyptian music
Coptic Orthodox Church
Church music